The 1935 Kentucky Wildcats football team was an American football team that represented the University of Kentucky as a member of the Southeastern Conference (SEC) during the 1935 college football season. In their second season under head coach Chet A. Wynne, the Wildcats compiled an overall record of 5–4 with a mark of 3–3 against conference opponents, tied for sixth place in the SEC, and outscored opponents by a total of 167 to 94. The team played its home games at McLean Stadium in Lexington, Kentucky.

Schedule

References

Kentucky
Kentucky Wildcats football seasons
Kentucky Wildcats football